Ethel Ronzoni Bishop (b. August 21, 1890 – 1975) was an American biochemist and physiologist.

Early life and education 
Ethel Ronzoni was born in California. She earned her BS degree from Mills College in 1913, her Master's from Columbia University in 1914, and her Ph.D. from the University of Wisconsin in 1923.

Work 
Ronzoni was an instructor of home economics at the University of Missouri from 1914 to 1917, and was assistant professor of Home Economics at the University of Minnesota for the 1917–18 academic year.

Following her PhD, Bishop joined the Washington University School of Medicine in 1923, where she worked as an assistant professor until 1943; she appears to be the first woman to have joined the School's academic faculty. While there, she ran the chemistry lab of the Department of Medicine and Barnes Hospital. In 1943 she was promoted to associate professor of biochemistry, a position she held until her retirement in 1959. After World War II, she switched to neuropsychiatry and ran the lab in the Department of Psychiatry.

As a researcher, Bishop's main focus was carbohydrate metabolism. She also researched amino acid metabolism, steroid hormones and muscle biochemistry.

Personal life 
While attending the University of Wisconsin, Ronzoni met George Holman Bishop. Bishop also worked at Washington University. Ronzoni and Bishop lived in the historical William Long Log House; after the death of Ronzoni in 1975, the St. Louis County took over the home.

References 

1890 births
1975 deaths
American women biochemists
American physiologists
Women physiologists
Columbia University alumni
Mills College alumni
University of Missouri staff
University of Wisconsin–Madison alumni
Washington University School of Medicine faculty
20th-century American women scientists
20th-century American chemists